Scott Howell may refer to:

 Scott Howell (political consultant), American conservative political consultant
 Scott Howell (politician) (born 1953), candidate for the United States Senate in Utah
 Scott Howell (footballer) (born 1958), Australian rules footballer
 Scott A. Howell (born 1965), United States Air Force general